|}

The Stand Cup is a Listed flat horse race in Great Britain open to horses aged three years or older.
It is run at Chester over a distance of 1 mile 4 furlongs and 63 yards (2,472 metres), and it is scheduled to take place each year in September.

The race was first run in 2006.

Winners

See also
 Horse racing in Great Britain
 List of British flat horse races

References 
Racing Post: 

Flat races in Great Britain
Chester Racecourse
Open middle distance horse races
Recurring sporting events established in 2006
2006 establishments in England